Night Stream is a 2013 short film written and directed by André Joseph and starring André Joseph, Aesha Waks, and Reginald L. Barnes. It premiered at the NewFilmmakers NY Fall Series in November 2013.

Cast
 André Joseph as Jeff "Mr. Nightstar" Willis
 Aesha Waks as Martina Rodriguez
 Reginald L. Barnes as "Easy" Eddie Mathis
 Erin Marie Adams as Crystal
 Cara D'Adamo as Jenna Johnson
 Illing Mui as Donna Mui
 Marc Williams as Marc Roberts

Release
The film premiered at the NewFilmmakers NY Fall Series in November 2013 and the 5th Annual World Music & Independent Film Festival in Washington, D.C. in August 2014. It went on sale on DVD at Amazon in October 2014.

Accolades
Reginald L. Barnes won the WMIFF Best Supporting Actor in Short Film Award in 2014. André Joseph was nominated for the WMIFF Best Actor in Short Film and Best Short Screenplay in 2014. Aesha Waks was nominated for the WMIFF Best Actress in Short Film in 2014.

References

External links
 
 Amazon.com DVD Link

2013 short films